National Tertiary Route 901, or just Route 901 (or ) is a National Road Route of Costa Rica, located in the Guanacaste province.

Description
In Guanacaste province the route covers Nandayure canton (Zapotal district), Hojancha canton (Puerto Carrillo district).

References

Highways in Costa Rica